Ingwald "Ingo" Preminger (25 February 1911 – 7 June 2006) was a film producer. He was also the literary agent for several writers, including Dalton Trumbo and Ring Lardner Jr., both of whom were blacklisted in the McCarthy era. He was the brother of actor-director-producer Otto Preminger.

Biography
Preminger was born to a Jewish family and studied law and worked as a lawyer in Vienna before emigrating to the United States due to the rise of Nazism. He was nominated for an Academy Award for the 1970 film M*A*S*H, the book of which had been sent to him by Lardner, and also produced The Salzburg Connection in 1972. He was survived by his wife of 70 years, Kate, and three children, including former New York probate judge Eve Preminger.

References

Sources
Vosbogh, Dick (2006) "Obituaries: Ingo Preminger", The Independent (London), August 11, 2006; accessed October 6, 2007.

External links
 

1911 births
2006 deaths
Austro-Hungarian Jews
Austrian emigrants to the United States
American film producers
American people of Austrian-Jewish descent
Literary agents
Mass media people from Chernivtsi
People from Greater Los Angeles
Ukrainian Jews
Bukovina Jews
American people of Ukrainian-Jewish descent